Mary Anne White  (born December 28, 1953) is a Canadian materials scientist who is the Harry Shirreff (Emerita) Professor of Chemical Research at Dalhousie University. Her research considers novel solar thermal materials and their application in renewable energy devices. She is the author of a textbook titled Physical Properties of Materials. She was appointed an Officer to the Order of Canada in 2016.

Early life and education 
White was born in London, Ontario. As a child, she was encouraged to complete science experiments. She attended the University of Western Ontario for undergraduate studies in chemistry. Returning in 2011 to deliver to convocation address, White explained, “By the end of the first week at Western, I knew that I had found my place in life… I had met ‘my people’ and being back at Western always brings back that excitement,”. She was a research student at McMaster University, where she worked under the supervision of James A. Morrison. She was a postdoctoral fellow at the University of Oxford and the University of Waterloo.

Research and career 
White began her academic career as an assistant professor at the University of Waterloo. In 1983 joined Dalhousie University, where she served as both Professor of Chemistry and Physics and Director of the Institute for Research in Materials. White developed novel thermal energy storage materials, specialising in areas such as materials that serve as efficient thermoelectrics and thermochromics, with low thermal expansion and the ability of phase-change materials to store heat. In 2010, White founded the Dalhousie Research in Energy, Advanced Materials and Sustainability (DREAMS) program. She was made Harry Shirreff Professor of Chemical Research Emerita in 2016.

White appeared on the CBC Radio show Maritime Noon, answering listener science questions.

Awards and honours 
 1993 Dalhousie University Faculty of Science Award for Excellence in Teaching
 1994 Calorimetry Conference Sunner Memorial Award
 1995 Elected Fellow, Chemical Institute of Canada
 1996 Chemical Institute of Canada Noranda Award
 2002 Elected as Fellow of the International Union of Pure and Applied Chemistry
 2002 Chemical Institute of Canada for Chemical Education Union Carbide Award
 2003 Inducted in Discovery Centre Hall of Fame
 2004 APICS/Canpolar Science Communication Award
 2007 Royal Society of Canada McNeil Medal
2008 McMaster University University Honorary Doctorate
 2011 University of Western Ontario Honorary Doctorate
 2012 American Chemical Society Award for Incorporation of Sustainability into Chemical Education
 2012 University of Alberta D.B. Robinson Distinguished Speaker
 2013 Elected as Fellow of the Royal Society of Canada
 2016 Appointed as Officer Order of Canada
 2017 University of Ottawa Honorary Doctorate
 2020 Chemical Institute of Canada Canadian Light Source T K Sham Award for Materials Chemistry

Selected publications

Book

Articles

Personal life 
White is married to Robert L. White, a biological chemist at Dalhousie University, with whom she has two children.

References 

1953 births
Living people
20th-century Canadian scientists
21st-century Canadian scientists
Academic staff of the Dalhousie University
University of Western Ontario alumni
McMaster University alumni
Fellows of the Royal Society of Canada
Officers of the Order of Canada
20th-century Canadian women scientists
21st-century Canadian women scientists
Canadian materials scientists